Go Down Moses is a Bahamian Rhyming Spiritual that was documented by Charles Edwards in his book "Bahama songs and stories" in 1895.

Lyrics
Go down Moses, hol' de key,
Don' let de vwin' blo' on de righteous,
Hey! Hey! Hey, my soul.

Hey! come a fish by the name of vwale,
Swallowed brothe' Jonah by the head an' tail-a,
Hey! Hey! Hey, my soul.

You want to go to heaven vw'en you die,
Jus' stop you' tongue from telling them lies,
Hey! Hey! Hey, my soul.

References

Bahamian songs